César Joel Valencia Castillo (born 16 November 1994) is an Ecuadorian professional footballer who plays as a winger for Eerste Divisie club De Graafschap, on loan from  club Brentford. He is a product of the Real Zaragoza academy and later played in Slovenia and Poland, rising to prominence in the latter country with Piast Gliwice. He was capped by Spain and Ecuador at U17 level.

Club career

Spain 
A winger, Valencia joined the Real Zaragoza academy in 2005, at age 11. By 2011, he had progressed into the club's reserve team and was called into the first team squad on three occasions during the 2011–12 season. Valencia made his only senior appearance for the club as a substitute for Pablo Barrera late in a 6–0 La Liga defeat to Real Madrid on 28 August 2011. He spent much of the following three years in the reserve team and on loan at Málaga B, before departing La Romareda to join Segunda División B club Logroñés in August 2014. He remained with Logroñés until January 2016 and made 54 appearances for the club, scoring one goal.

Slovenia and Poland 
On 29 January 2016, Valencia moved to Slovenia to join PrvaLiga club Koper. He made 28 appearances and scored two goals during 18 months at the Bonifika Stadium, before departing to join Polish Ekstraklasa club Piast Gliwice in August 2017, one a one-year contract, with a three-year option. Valencia was a part of the club's 2018–19 Ekstraklasa-winning team and his exploits were recognised with the Ekstraklasa and Polish Union of Footballers Player of the Year awards and a place in the Polish Union of Footballers Team of the Year. By the time of his departure in late July 2019, he had made 65 appearances and scored 9 goals for the club.

Brentford 
On 31 July 2019, Valencia moved to England to join Championship club Brentford on a four-year contract for an undisclosed fee, reported to be £1.8 million. Despite making 23 appearances and scoring one goal, he struggled to adapt to the pace of English football during the 2019–20 season. After just one appearance during the opening month of 2020–21, Valencia returned to Poland to join Ekstraklasa club Legia Warsaw on loan until the end of the season. During a season affected by a plethora of injury problems and poor form, Valencia made just 12 appearances and scored no goals. After three months without being named in a matchday squad, he made an early return to Brentford for medical assessment in April 2021. In his absence, Legia won the Ekstraklasa title with three matches to spare. Also in his absence, Brentford were promoted to the Premier League after victory in the 2021 Championship play-off Final.

Valencia entered the 2021–22 pre-season fully fit and on his return to match play, he scored the only goal of a friendly versus AFC Wimbledon on 17 July 2021. A move away from the Community Stadium did not materialise before the end of the summer transfer window and despite being named in Brentford's 25-man Premier League squad list, Valencia was frozen out of the squad and instead made sporadic appearances for the club's B team during the first half of the 2021–22 season. On 18 January 2022, Valencia returned to Spain to join Segunda División club AD Alcorcón on loan until the end of the 2021–22 season. He made 18 appearances during his spell, which culminated in relegation to the Primera División RFEF.

Ahead of the 2022–23 season, Valencia made just one substitute appearance for the B team during pre-season and was not issued a first team squad number. On 31 August 2022, he joined Dutch Eerste Divisie club De Graafschap on loan until the end of the 2022–23 season, with an option to buy. Valencia made 11 appearances prior to suffering a knee injury in mid-November 2022.

International career 
Valencia was capped by Spain and Ecuador at U17 level. He was a part of Ecuador's 2011 FIFA U17 World Cup squad and made three appearances at the tournament.

Personal life 
Valencia was born in Quinindé, Esmeraldas, Ecuador and moved to Spain in 2002, at age 8. He has a Spanish passport. Valencia's partner Paulina Chapko gave birth to a child in July 2022.

Career statistics

Honours 

 Piast Gliwice

 Ekstraklasa: 2018–19

Individual

 Ekstraklasa Player of the Year: 2018–19
 Ekstraklasa Midfielder of the Year: 2018–19
Polish Union of Footballers Player of the Year: 2018–19
Polish Union of Footballers Team of the Year: 2018–19

References

External links 

Joel Valencia at brentfordfc.com
Joel Valencia at degraafschap.nl

 
 
 Joel Valencia at lapreferente.com

1994 births
Living people
People from Quinindé Canton
Ecuadorian emigrants to Spain
Spanish people of Ecuadorian descent
Sportspeople of Ecuadorian descent
Spanish footballers
Spain youth international footballers
Ecuadorian footballers
Ecuador youth international footballers
Association football wingers
La Liga players
Segunda División B players
Tercera División players
Slovenian PrvaLiga players
Ekstraklasa players
English Football League players
Real Zaragoza B players
Real Zaragoza players
Atlético Malagueño players
UD Logroñés players
FC Koper players
Piast Gliwice players
Brentford F.C. players
Ecuadorian expatriate footballers
Expatriate footballers in Slovenia
Expatriate footballers in Poland
Expatriate footballers in England
Ecuadorian expatriate sportspeople in England
Legia Warsaw players
AD Alcorcón footballers
Segunda División players
De Graafschap players
Ecuadorian expatriate sportspeople in the Netherlands
Expatriate footballers in the Netherlands
Eerste Divisie players